Stiliyan Makarski (born 18 March 1985) is a Bulgarian badminton player. In 2008, he won the Banuinvest International tournament in mixed doubles event.

Achievements

BWF International Challenge/Series 
Men's doubles

Mixed doubles

  BWF International Challenge tournament
  BWF International Series tournament
  BWF Future Series tournament

References

External links 
 

1985 births
Living people
Sportspeople from Sofia
Bulgarian male badminton players
21st-century Bulgarian people